Med City FC is a men's soccer club based in Rochester, Minnesota. It competes in the NPSL Midwest Region's North Conference. The club's colors are blue and green.

History
Med City FC was founded in 2017 by Frank Spaeth, joining NPSL's North Conference as an expansion team.

In late 2019, City was announced as a participant in the 2020 U.S. Open Cup due to its performance in the previous season. This would be the team's first appearance in the tournament. However, on March 13, 2020, U.S. Soccer elected to temporarily suspend the tournament due to the ongoing COVID-19 pandemic.

Current staff

Player roster

Note: Flags indicate national team as defined under FIFA eligibility rules. Players may hold more than one non-FIFA nationality.

Staff 
  Neil Cassidy – Head Coach
  Israel Perez Medina – Assistant Coach
  Mitch Amundson – Assistant Coach
  Frank Spaeth – Manager

Supporters
The team's main supporter group is the Sawbones Army. The group's main purpose is "to create a rooting section for the club, complete with drumming, flags, scarves, and constant chanting and cheering." The group has been officially recognized by the team as of the 2018 season.

Year-by-year

References

External links
 

2017 establishments in Minnesota
Association football clubs established in 2017
Soccer clubs in Minnesota
National Premier Soccer League teams